The Third Avenue Bridge is a landmark structure of the city of Minneapolis, Minnesota, United States, originally known as the St. Anthony Falls Bridge. It carries road traffic across the Mississippi River and upper fringes of Saint Anthony Falls. The multi-arched bridge meets with Third Avenue in downtown Minneapolis at its south end, but curves as it crosses the river, and connects with Central Avenue on its north end. The shallow "S" curve in the bridge was built to avoid fractures in the limestone bedrock that supports the bridge piers. The road is also designated Minnesota State Highway 65. Construction began in 1914, and it opened four years later in 1918. The bridge, which uses Melan arches of an open spandrel design, has been modified since that time. The 2,223-foot (667.6 m) crossing was designed by city engineer Frederick W. Cappelen, who also created plans for other similar bridges in Minneapolis such as the Franklin Avenue Bridge. It cost US$862,254.00 at the time of construction.

Renovation
The bridge underwent a major overhaul in 1979–1980. Another restoration is underway to extend its life 50 years with a new deck, and other improvements to barriers, railings, and lighting. As the bridge is a contributing member of the St. Anthony Falls Historic District, a goal of the project is preserving its historic design elements. The construction project began in May 2020 with partial closure of the bridge, and was fully closed to traffic on January 4, 2021. The bridge was originally anticipated to reopen November 2022, but is now scheduled to reopen in the summer of 2023. The project is being led by Burnsville-based Ames Construction.

See also
List of crossings of the Upper Mississippi River

Notes

References
Bridges 2005: Third Avenue Bridge - Saint Anthony Main .
Third Avenue Bridge - Minneapolis Riverfront District Bridges 2005.

External links

Bridges over the Mississippi River
Bridges in Minneapolis
Bridges completed in 1918
Road bridges on the National Register of Historic Places in Minnesota
Concrete bridges in Minnesota
Historic district contributing properties in Minnesota
National Register of Historic Places in Minneapolis
Open-spandrel deck arch bridges in the United States
Shared-use paths in Minneapolis